Revolutionary Love is a 2017 South Korean television series starring Choi Si-won, Kang So-ra and Gong Myung about young people's challenges as they move forward in society. The series marks Choi Si-won's first acting project after his military service. It aired from October 14 to December 3, 2017 on tvN's Saturdays and Sundays at 21:00 KST time slot.

Synopsis
Byun Hyuk (Choi Si-won) is the happy-go-lucky second son of Byun Kang-soo (Choi Jae-sung), the chairman of Gangsu Group. Byun Woo-sung (Lee Jae-yoon), the elder son of Byun Kang-soo, is jealous of his younger brother and seizes opportunities to bring him down.

Kwon Jae-hoon (Gong Myung) is a long time friend of Byun Hyuk and is employed by Gangsu Group to cover up the follies of Hyuk. Jae-hoon's father is a loyal driver of Kang-soo and also has gone to jail because of Hyuk's mistake, which is the cause of Jae-hoon's hatred towards Hyuk.

Baek Joon (Kang So-ra) is a street-smart girl who has multiple part-time jobs and refuses to settle in a full-time permanent job. Her father was wronged by Gangsu Group after being a loyal employee for a long time. She has a crush on Jae-hoon, who is extremely cold towards her.

When Byun Hyuk accidentally meets Baek Joon, he is wearing a custodian's uniform. This leads Joon to believe that Hyuk is just a regular employee of Gangsu Group. Later, when Hyuk is kicked out of his house, he comes to live with Jae-hoon. Joon forces Hyuk to take part-time jobs and in the process imbues him with the confidence to fight Gangsu Group's misconduct and oppressive business policies and practices.

With Woo-sung and Kang-soo fighting hard to bring Hyuk down, Kwon Jae-hoon, Byun Hyuk and Baek Joon unite to expose the corruption of Gangsu Group.

Cast

Main
 Choi Si-won as Byun Hyuk, an unemployed third-generation chaebol who hides his true identity as the second son of a wealthy family and begins living in a studio apartment.
 Kang So-ra as Baek Joon, a hardworking young woman who has a university education but makes her living by working part-time jobs.
 Gong Myung as Kwon Jae-hoon, a highly intelligent young man who is the chief of a secretarial team at a company owned by Byun Hyuk's family.
 Son Sang-yeon as young Jae-hoon

Supporting

People around Byun Hyuk
 Lee Jae-yoon as Byun Woo-sung, Byun Hyuk's brother.
 Choi Jae-sung as Byun Kang-soo, Byun Hyuk's father.
 Seo Yi-an as Hong Chae-ri, the youngest daughter of Chairman Hong, the owner of a hotel chain. She is Byun Hyuk's ex-girlfriend.
 Kyeon Mi-ri as Jung Yeo-jin, Byun Hyuk's mother.
 Jung Chan-bi as Byun Se-na, Byun Hyuk's sister.
 Kim Eung-suk as Byun Gang-ho, Byun Huk's uncle. 
 Kim Ye-ryeong as Byun Geum-hee, Byun Hyuk's aunt.

People around Baek Joon
 Kim Ye-won as Ha Yeon-hee, Baek Joon's best friend who is a flight attendant.
 Jeon Bae-soo as Baek Joon's father.
 Hwang Young-hee as Baek Joon's mother.

People around Je-hoon
 Choi Gyu-hwan as Hwang Myeong-soo, a prosecutor at the Seoul Central Court.
 Lee Han-wi as Kwon Choon-sub, Je-hoon's father.
 Kim Ki-doo as Chief Yang, Jae-hoon's co-worker.

Others
 Choi Dae-chul as Lee Tae-kyung, Baek Joon's colleague at the construction company. 
 Seo Hyun-chul as Kim Ki-sub, Baek Joon's colleague at the construction company.
 Hwang Jung-min as An Mi-yeon, Baek Joon's colleague at the construction company.
 Kang Young-seok as Jang Cheol-min, a policeman involved in arresting Byun Hyuk, who later becomes his neighbour by coincidence. He becomes Yeon-hee's boyfriend.
 Kim Seung-wook as Sul Gi-hwan, an employee of Byun Group. He was a friend of Baek Joon's father. 
 Song Young-kyu as CEO Min
 Yoon Jeong-hyuk as General Manager Han
 Lee Tae-kyung as Byun Hyuk's friend

Special appearance
 Lee Yoon-ji as the hotel manager (Ep. 1–2)

Production
 The series is produced by Samhwa Networks and created by Studio Dragon and Kang Eun-kyung's creative group called Plot Line.
 The first table script reading of the cast took place on September 10, 2017.

Original soundtrack

Part 1

Part 2

Part 3

Part 4

Part 5

Ratings

References

External links
  
 Revolutionary Love at Studio Dragon 
 Revolutionary Love at Samhwa Networks 
 
 

Korean-language television shows
TVN (South Korean TV channel) television dramas
2017 South Korean television series debuts
2017 South Korean television series endings
South Korean romance television series
South Korean romantic comedy television series
Television series by Studio Dragon
Television series by Samhwa Networks